Fraser Sheat (born 29 April 1998) is a New Zealand cricketer. He made his first-class debut for Canterbury in the 2017–18 Plunket Shield season on 23 October 2017. He made his List A debut for Canterbury in the 2017–18 Ford Trophy on 3 December 2017.

In June 2020, he was offered a contract by Canterbury ahead of the 2020–21 domestic cricket season. In October 2020, in the second round of the 2020–21 Plunket Shield season, Sheat took his first five-wicket haul in first-class cricket. He made his Twenty20 debut on 3 January 2021, for Canterbury in the 2020–21 Super Smash.

References

External links
 

1998 births
Living people
New Zealand cricketers
Place of birth missing (living people)
Canterbury cricketers